Quiet Fire may refer to
Quiet Fire (Roberta Flack album), 1971
Quiet Fire (Frank Morgan and Bud Shank album), 1991
Quiet Fire (George Cables album), 1995
"Quiet Fire" a composition by George Cables which first appeared on his album Why Not, 1975
"Quiet Fire", a song by Melody Gardot on her album Worrisome Heart, 2006